Dundee Handball Club, is a handball club from Dundee, Scotland. They play in the Scottish National League, their first season being 2011/2012.

History 

Dundee Handball Club was formed in 2011 as a result of the need for the sport in Dundee by foreign players. In its first year, the handball club only hosted a men's team and was based at the ISE, University of Dundee Campus, Dundee, Tayside, Scotland.

Dundee Handball Club is affiliated to the Scottish Handball Association and currently competes in the Scottish Handball League. With the entrance of Dundee Handball Club into the Scottish Handball League the competition, between the teams within the league, has grown stronger. Dundee Handball Club had a good first year as they finished 5th in the Scottish Handball League. The men's team also reached the Final stage of the Scottish National Handball Cup, beating both RGU Aberdeen HC in the Quarter-final stage and Ravenscraig HC in the Semi-final stage. They lost to Edinburgh HC in the Final, but DHC showed they are a competitive club and a strong rival for all teams in the Scottish Handball League.

In their second year, Dundee Handball Club established the first Women's Handball team in Dundee, with players from all over Europe. The ladies went on to compete in the Scottish Handball League, finishing last but gaining a tremendous amount of experience. They went on to compete in the Scottish National Handball Cup and reaching the Semi-final stage, where they withdrew due to the lack of players available to compete. The men's team, with 1 years experience managed to finish in 4th place in the Scottish Handball League, above newcomers RGU Aberdeen HC and just below veterans Glasgow HC. In the cup fixtures, the men beat RGU Aberdeen HC in the quarter-final stage and managed to give Tryst HC a run for their money in the Semi-final stage, but lost to, Champions and Cup winners 2012/2013, Tryst HC.

The club purports to welcome students and non-students of all ages, abilities, genders and nationalities and draws players from the student body at both University of Dundee and Abertay University. DHC is run by a committee of two handball dedicated individuals (Jamie Lau & Stelios Nikolaou), but also works in partnership with SportDundee  (Dundee City Council). and ActiveSchools Dundee

Previous Seasons

2011 / 2012

Squad

League Fixtures/Results

Top goalscorers

Men's League table 2011/12

For this season a new points system has been adopted for both the men's and women's leagues:

3 Points for a Win
2 Points for a Draw
1 Point for a Defeat by 10 goals or less
0 Points for a Defeat greater than 11 goals

The reason for this is to make both league's more competitive.

Current Season 2012/2013

Teams

References

External links
Dundee Handball Club

Sport in Dundee
Scottish handball clubs